Silicon Graphics International Corp. (SGI; formerly Rackable Systems, Inc.) was an American manufacturer of computer hardware and software, including high-performance computing systems, x86-based servers for datacenter deployment, and visualization products. The company was founded as Rackable Systems in 1999, but adopted the "SGI" name in 2009 after acquiring Silicon Graphics Inc. out of bankruptcy.

On November 1, 2016, Hewlett Packard Enterprise completed its acquisition of SGI for $275 million.

History

Rackable Systems, Inc. era
Rackable Systems Inc. went public in June 2005, with 6.25 million shares offered at $12 per share.

In 2006, Rackable announced it had signed an agreement to acquire Terrascale Technologies, Inc.

On April 1, 2009, Rackable announced an agreement to acquire Silicon Graphics, Inc. for $25 million. The purchase, ultimately for $42.5 million, was finalized on May 11, 2009; at the same time, Rackable announced their adoption of "SGI" as their global name and brand.  The following week, the company changed their NASDAQ stock ticker symbol from "RACK" to "SGI".

Silicon Graphics International Corp. era
The "new" SGI began with two main product lines: servers and storage continuing from the original Rackable Systems; and servers, storage, visualization and professional services acquired from Silicon Graphics, Inc. At the time of the acquisition's completion, SGI said that they anticipated the survival of the majority of the two companies' product lines, although some consolidation was likely in areas of high overlap between products.

In 2010, SGI announced the purchase of all the assets and assumed a limited amount of liabilities of COPAN Systems. COPAN was a provider of storage archive products for real-time access to long-term persistent data. COPAN products were offered as part of the SGI storage line.

In 2011, SGI acquired all outstanding shares of SGI Japan, Ltd. The same year, the company announced the acquisition of OpenCFD Ltd. In December, the company announced Mark J. Barrenechea's resignation as president, chief executive officer and member of the board of directors. Mark was reported to join Open Text Corporation. Shortly thereafter, it was announced that Barrenechea had agreed to continue to serve on the SGI board.

In February 2012, it was announced that Jorge Luis Titinger would become SGI's president and chief executive officer.

In 2013 SGI acquired FileTek, Inc.

On August 11, 2016, it was announced that Hewlett Packard Enterprise would acquire SGI for $7.75 per share in cash, a transaction valued at approximately $275 million, net of cash and debt. The deal was completed on November 1, 2016.

See also
 NUMAlink

References

 
1982 establishments in California
2005 initial public offerings
2016 disestablishments in California
2016 mergers and acquisitions
American companies established in 1982
American companies established in 1999
American companies disestablished in 2016
Companies formerly listed on the Nasdaq
Computer companies established in 1982
Computer companies established in 1999
Computer companies disestablished in 2016
Defunct companies based in the San Francisco Bay Area
Defunct computer companies of the United States
Defunct software companies of the United States
Graphics hardware companies
Hewlett-Packard acquisitions
Hewlett-Packard Enterprise acquisitions
Manufacturing companies based in San Jose, California
Software companies established in 1999
Technology companies based in the San Francisco Bay Area
Technology companies disestablished in 2016
Technology companies established in 1999